Sven Olof Nylander (born 1 January 1962) is a Swedish retired hurdler, who is best known for winning two silver medals at the European Championships in 1990 and 1994. He represented his native country in three Summer Olympics (1984, 1992 and 1996), and set his personal best (47.98 s) in the men's 400 metres hurdles on 1 August 1996 in Atlanta, Georgia.

Nylander finished fourth in four global championships (World Athletics Championships 1983 and 1987 - Olympic Games 1984 and 1996).  He also finished fifth in the 1995 World Athletics Championship.

Nylander attended Southern Methodist University ("SMU") in Dallas, Texas, USA on an athletic scholarship, where he was a member of the track and field team.

During the European Championships in Gothenburg 2006, Nylander attended a party on a night club in central Gothenburg. He, former high jumper Patrik Sjöberg and sprinter Patrik Lövgren, was later stopped by the police and brought to the police station where they left urine samples, under suspicion of drug use. In interviews, Nylander at first claimed that he had not used narcotics. A couple of days later, Nylander confessed to having used cocaine during the party.

International competitions
All results regarding 400 metres hurdles

Notes

References

1962 births
Living people
Swedish male hurdlers
Athletes (track and field) at the 1984 Summer Olympics
Athletes (track and field) at the 1992 Summer Olympics
Athletes (track and field) at the 1996 Summer Olympics
Olympic athletes of Sweden
European Athletics Championships medalists
People from Varberg
Sportspeople from Halland County